Claire Windsor may refer to:

Claire Windsor (actress)
Claire Windsor, Countess of Ulster (physician)